Sini Junction railway station is a railway station on Howrah–Nagpur–Mumbai line under Chakradharpur railway division of South Eastern Railway zone. It is situated at Sini, Seraikela Kharsawan district in the Indian state of Jharkhand.

Electrification
The Sini–Tatanagar section was electrified in 1961–62.

References

Railway stations in Seraikela Kharsawan district
Chakradharpur railway division